Shir Giyan served as Prime Minister of the Kingdom of Afghanistan from January 1929 to November 1, 1929. He was preceded by Shir Ahmad and was succeeded by Mohammad Hashim Khan after being deposed. He died in 1929.

See also

References

Prime Ministers of Afghanistan
Date of birth missing
1929 deaths
20th-century Afghan politicians